This is a list of British television related events from 1978.

Events

January
2 January – The first episode of the science fiction series Blake's 7 is broadcast on BBC1.  
4 January – The first edition of the arts series The South Bank Show is broadcast, presented by Melvyn Bragg and replaces Aquarius.
8 January – All Creatures Great and Small debuts on BBC1.
20 January – The first of ITV's occasional An Audience With programmes is aired. The first presenter is Jasper Carrott. 
21 January
The sci-fi TV series Logan's Run is shown on ITV.
The ITV variety and sketch series The Les Dawson Show is first broadcast. 
27 January – In an interview for Granada Television's World in Action, Leader of the Opposition Margaret Thatcher remarks, "people are really rather afraid that this country might be rather swamped by people with a different culture". Critics regard the comment as a veiled reference to people of colour,  thus pandering to xenophobia and reactionary sentiment. However, she receives 10,000 letters thanking her for raising the subject and the Conservatives gain a lead against Labour in the opinion polls.

February
6 February – The BBC broadcasts the inaugural World Darts Championship run by the British Darts Organisation with evening highlights until 10 February.
 8 February –The first episode of the influential Comprehensive school series Grange Hill is broadcast on BBC1.  The Phil Redmond devised teenage drama would become one of the longest-running programmes on British television, lasting until 2008.
13 February – Anna Ford becomes the first female newscaster on News at Ten.
21 February – The supernatural drama series Armchair Thriller makes its debut on ITV. 
22 February – The Police appear in an advert for Wrigley's chewing gum.
24 February – The BBC airs Going Straight. The sitcom is a direct spin-off from Porridge, starring Ronnie Barker as Norman Stanley Fletcher, newly released from the fictional Slade Prison where Porridge had been set. The programme runs for one series.

March
5 March - Elvis Presley's Aloha from Hawaii via Satellite finally makes its British television premiere on BBC1.
7 March – Dennis Potter's groundbreaking drama serial Pennies From Heaven is broadcast on BBC1.

April
3 April – ITV begins showing the courtroom drama Rumpole of the Bailey. 
6 April – The four-part drama series Law & Order begins on BBC2. Each of the four stories within the series is told from a different perspective, including that of the Detective, the Villain, the Brief and the Prisoner. The series proves to be highly controversial upon its release due to its depiction of a corrupt British law enforcement and legal system.
17 April – The BBC begins broadcasting the World Snooker Championship with daily highlights until the final on 29 April. Previously, they only had highlights of the final on Grandstand with slightly further coverage last year.

May
24 May – The iconic skateboarding duck item first airs on BBC1's Nationwide.
26 May – The Incredible Hulk, starring Bill Bixby as David Bruce Banner and Lou Ferrigno as The Hulk makes its UK television debut on ITV.
28–29 May – The network television premiere of Francis Ford Coppola's 1972 blockbuster crime film The Godfather, starring Marlon Brando and Al Pacino and airing as a two-part presentation over two consecutive nights on BBC1.

June
3 June – The long-running US children's series Sesame Street begins airing on both ATV and Border.
16 June – ITV broadcasts the documentary The Making of Star Wars.

July
1 July – BBC1 begins showing the US superhero television series Wonder Woman, starring Lynda Carter.
3 July – The debut of The Kenny Everett Video Show featuring the comedian and DJ Kenny Everett in a series of sketches on ITV. 
13 July – The original series of Top Gear begins airing on BBC2 having started as a locally produced programme at BBC Pebble Mill the previous year.
29 July – ITV airs the first episode of the Yorkshire Television produced game show 3-2-1, presented by Ted Rogers, featuring the character "Dusty Bin". The first episode is also notable for the appearance of DJ Janice Long as a contestant.

August
 30 August - The first edition of Midweek Sports Special is broadcast on ITV.

September
4 September – The network television premiere of the 1969 James Bond film On Her Majesty's Secret Service on ITV, starring George Lazenby.
5 September 
 The US soap opera Dallas is broadcast for the first time in the UK on BBC1.
 Thames Television launches a lunchtime Thames News bulletin presented by Robin Houston. A late evening bulletin to follow News at Ten is also planned for the same day, but union problems lead to its launch being postponed until 1980.
10 September – Return of the Saint returns with new actor  Ian Ogilvy and introducing the Jaguar XJ-S to take over the Volvo P1800 from the Saint 1962 TV series. The first episode is The Judas Game.
15 September – The American sitcom Soap is for broadcast on ITV.
23 September – Larry Grayson succeeds Bruce Forsyth as presenter of The Generation Game.

October
17 October – James Burke's history of science series Connections is first broadcast on BBC1. 
18 October – Morecambe and Wise return to ITV for their long-running comedy sketch show The Morecambe & Wise Show.

November
6 November – ITV airs the first episode of Edward & Mrs. Simpson, a seven-part British television series that dramatises the events leading to the 1936 abdication of King Edward VIII who gave up his throne to marry the twice-divorced American Wallis Simpson.
10 November – Debut of Carla Lane's family sitcom Butterflies on BBC2.
23 November – 15th anniversary of the first episode of the long-running science-fiction series Doctor Who.
27 November – The Times reports that News International will sell 16% of its share in London Weekend Television, reducing its shares from 39.7% to 25%.
November – ITV starts broadcasting the ORACLE teletext service. It ends on 31 December 1992.

December

21–22 December – BBC1 and BBC2 are forced off the air due to industrial action at the BBC by the ABS union which starts on Thursday 21 December. The following day the radio unions join their BBC Television counterparts, forcing the BBC to merge their four national radio networks into one national radio station, the BBC All Network Radio Service, from 4pm that afternoon. The strike is settled shortly before 10pm on 22 December with the unions and BBC management reaching an agreement at the British government's industrial disputes arbitration service ACAS. BBC1 resumes broadcast at 3pm on Saturday 23 December with BBC2 resuming at 1pm the same afternoon. Threat of disruption to the BBC's festive television schedules is averted. BBC Radio networks resume normal schedules on the morning of Saturday 23 December.
25 December 
BBC1 airs the network television premiere of Rodgers and Hammerstein's 1965 family musical film The Sound of Music, starring Julie Andrews.
The network television premiere of the 1971 James Bond film Diamonds Are Forever on ITV, starring Sean Connery in his final official appearance as 007.
26 December – BBC1 screen the network television premiere of William Friedkin's 1971 Oscar winning crime thriller The French Connection, starring Gene Hackman and Roy Scheider.
28 December – ITV airs the final episode of The Sweeney.
December – A strike forces Yorkshire Television off air throughout the entire Christmas period. The strike commenced on 17 December 1978, with normal service not resumed on Yorkshire Television until 5.45pm on Wednesday 3 January 1979. Many of ITV's Christmas programmes are eventually shown in early 1979 after the dispute has ended.

Debuts

BBC1
1 January – Rebecca of Sunnybrook Farm (1978)
2 January – Blake's 7 (1978–1981)
3 January -  The Story of Perrine (1978)
4 January – A Traveller in Time (1978)
8 January – All Creatures Great and Small (1978–1990, 2020–present)
21 January – The Les Dawson Show (1978–1989)
29 January – Hawkmoor (1978)
 February – Grand Slam (1978)
8 February – Grange Hill (1978–2008)
24 February – Going Straight (1978)
1 March – The Hong Kong Beat (documentary) (1978)
7 March – Pennies from Heaven (1978)
9 March – Breakaway Girls (1978)
4 April – The Standard (1978)
10 April – Cheggers Plays Pop (1978–1986)
1 May – The Little and Large Show (1978–1991)
17 June – Lennie and Jerry (1978–1980)
5 September – Dallas (1978–1991) 
10 September – Sexton Blake and the Demon God (1978)
18 September – Tycoon (1978)
20 September – Touch and Go (1978)
24 September – A Horseman Riding By (1978)
30 September – Scotch and Wry (1978–1992)
10 October –  Space Sentinels (1977)
13 October – Rings on Their Fingers (1978–1980)
22 October – Huntingtower (1978)
25 October – The Hills of Heaven (1978)
15 November – The Moon Stallion (1978)
3 December – Pinocchio (1978)
31 December – The Mill on the Floss (1978–1979)

BBC2
15 January - Ski Sunday (1978–present)
17 January – In the Looking Glass (1978)
22 January – The Mayor of Casterbridge (1978)
11 March – Something Else (1978–1982)
6 April – Law & Order (1978)
17 April – Pickersgill People (1978)
30 April – The Devil's Crown (1978)
7 May - Grand Prix (1978-1996, 2009–2015)
5 June – An Englishman's Castle (1978)
19 September – Look and Read: Sky Hunter (1978)
20 September – Langrishe, Go Down (1978)
24 September – Wuthering Heights (1978)
11 October – The Lost Boys (1978)
26 October – Gauguin the Savage (1978)
30 October – And Now the Good News (1978)
31 October – Empire Road (1978)
31 October – The Voyage of Charles Darwin (1978)
2 November – Accident (1978)
10 November – Butterflies (1978–1983, 2000)
3 December – BBC Television Shakespeare (1978–1985)

ITV
3 January – Glad Day: A Celebration for William Blake (1978) (Musical drama)
7 January – Logan's Run (1978)
11 January – Cloppa Castle (1978–1979)
13 January – Maggie and Her (1978–1979)
14 January – The South Bank Show (1978–2010, 2012–present)
15 January – Do You Remember? (1978)
16 January – Hazell (1978–1979)
17 January – Wilde Alliance (1978)
21 January – Enemy at the Door (1978–1981)
22 January – The Prime of Miss Jean Brodie (1978)
20 February – Warrior Queen (1978)
21 February – Armchair Thriller (1978–1981)
1 March – Send in the Girls (1978)
3 March – Mixed Blessings (1978–1980)
12 March – The Doombolt Chase (1978)
3 April – Rumpole of the Bailey (1978–1992)
23 April – Come Back, Lucy  (1978)
29 April – Scorpion Tales (1978)
26 May – The Incredible Hulk (1977–1982)
5 June – Strangers (1978–1982)
13 June 
 Life Begins at Forty (1978–1980)
 Will Shakespeare (1978)
3 July 
The Famous Five (1978–1979)
The Kenny Everett Video Show (1978–1981)
8 July 
The Law Centre (1978)
Saturday Banana (1978)
9 July – William and Dorothy (1978)
13 July – Leave It to Charlie (1978–1980)
16 July – The Rime of the Ancient Mariner (1978)
18 July – Spearhead (1978–1981)
23 July – Parables (1978)
24 July – Out (1978)
29 July – 3-2-1 (1978–1988)
31 July – A Soft Touch (1978)
8 August – The Bass Player and the Blonde (1978)
5 September –Disraeli (1978)
7 September – Jabberjaw (1976–1978)
9 September 
Saturday Night People (1978–1980)
The Bubblies (1978–1984)
10 September – Return of the Saint (1978–1979)
11 September – Cooper, Just Like That (1978)
13 September – Born and Bred (1978)
15 September – Soap (1977-1981)
18 September – The Sandbaggers (1978–1980)
24 September 
Bless Me, Father (1978–1981)
Lillie (1978)
7 October – Bruce Forsyth's Big Night (1978, 1980)
8 October – The Clifton House Mystery (1978)
18 October – The Morecambe & Wise Show  (1978–1983)
23 October – Bernie  (1978–1980)
24 October – The Upchat Connection (1978)
1 November – The One and Only Phyllis Dixey (1978)
6 November - Edward and Mrs Simpson (1978)
12 November – The Losers (1978)
14 November – Fallen Hero (1978–1979)
2 December – By Alan Bennett - Six Plays (1978–1979)

Continuing television shows

1920s
BBC Wimbledon (1927–1939, 1946–2019, 2021–present)

1930s
The Boat Race (1938–1939, 1946–2019)
BBC Cricket (1939, 1946–1999, 2020–2024)

1940s
Come Dancing (1949–1998)

1950s
The Good Old Days (1953–1983)
Panorama (1953–present)
Crackerjack (1955–1984, 2020–present)
What the Papers Say (1956–2008)
The Sky at Night (1957–present)
Blue Peter (1958–present)
Grandstand (1958–2007)

1960s
Coronation Street (1960–present)
Songs of Praise (1961–present)
Animal Magic (1962–1983)
Doctor Who (1963–1989, 1996, 2005–present)
World in Action (1963–1998)
Top of the Pops (1964–2006)
Match of the Day (1964–present)
Crossroads (1964–1988, 2001–2003)
Play School (1964–1988)
Mr. and Mrs. (1965–1999)
World of Sport (1965–1985)
Jackanory (1965–1996, 2006)
Sportsnight (1965–1997)
It's a Knockout (1966–1982, 1999–2001)
The Money Programme (1966–2010) 
ITV Playhouse (1967–1982)
Magpie (1968–1980)
The Big Match (1968–2002)
The Liver Birds (1969–1979, 1996)
Nationwide (1969–1983)
Screen Test (1969–1984)

1970s
The Goodies (1970–1982)
The Onedin Line (1971–1980)
The Old Grey Whistle Test (1971–1987)
The Two Ronnies (1971–1987, 1991, 1996, 2005)
General Hospital (1972–1979)
Sykes (1972–1979)
Thunderbirds (1972-1980, 1984–1987)
Clapperboard (1972–1982)
Crown Court (1972–1984)
Pebble Mill at One (1972–1986)
Are You Being Served? (1972–1985)
Rainbow (1972–1992, 1994–1997)
Emmerdale (1972–present)
Newsround (1972–present)
Weekend World (1972–1988)
Pipkins (1973–1981)
We Are the Champions (1973–1987)
Last of the Summer Wine (1973–2010)
That's Life! (1973–1994)
It Ain't Half Hot Mum (1974–1981)
Tiswas (1974–1982)
Wish You Were Here...? (1974–2003)
Celebrity Squares (1975–1979, 1993–1997, 2014–2015) 
The Cuckoo Waltz (1975–1980)
Arena (1975–present)
Jim'll Fix It (1975–1994)
The Muppet Show (1976–1981)
When the Boat Comes In (1976–1981)
Multi-Coloured Swap Shop (1976–1982)
Rentaghost (1976–1984)
One Man and His Dog (1976–present)
Robin's Nest (1977–1981)
You're Only Young Twice (1977–1981)
The Professionals (1977–1983)

Ending this year
 20 March – Opportunity Knocks (1956–1978, 1987–1990)
 10 April – 1990 (1977–1978)
 15 April – Within These Walls (1974–1978)
 9 May – Rising Damp (1974–1978)
 24 May – A Bunch of Fives (1977–1978)
 10 June – The Good Life (1975–1978)
 21 July – The Black and White Minstrel Show (1958–1978)
 August – This Week (1956–1978, 1986–1992)
 20 September – Z-Cars (1962–1978)
 20 December – Happy Ever After (1974–1978)
 25 December – Some Mothers Do 'Ave 'Em (1973–1978)
 28 December – The Sweeney (1975–1978)
 31 December - The Story of Perrine (1978)

Births
 22 February – Jenny Frost, singer, dancer, television presenter and model
 23 March  — Joanna Page, actress
 31 March  – Daniel Mays, actor
 28 April — Lauren Laverne, radio and television presenter and singer
 9 May – Georgina Mellor, British actress (Footballers' Wives: Extra Time)
 29 May — Adam Rickitt, actor
 10 July — Sarah-Jane Mee, journalist and news and sports presenter
 11 July — Dustin Demri-Burns, actor, comedian and writer
 24 July — Joanna Taylor, actress and model
 19 August — Callum Blue, actor
 8 November — Jane Danson, actress
 17 November – Tom Ellis, actor

Deaths
 11 January – Michael Bates, actor (born 1920)
 21 July – Henry Longhurst, golf commentator (born 1909)
 5 October – May Warden, actress (born 1891)
 1 December – David Nixon, magician (born 1919)

See also
 1978 in British music
 1978 in British radio
 1978 in the United Kingdom
 List of British films of 1978

References